Post-ablation tubal sterilization syndrome (PATSS) is a rare complication that could occur in patients with prior tubal sterilization following an endometrial ablation procedure. Occult bleeding into the obstructed tubes causes tubal distention and cyclic pelvic pain.

Endometrial ablation devices are used for the treatment of menorrhagia due to dysfunctional uterine bleeding. As the popularity of safer, effective, and less invasive procedures increase, the obstetrics and gynecology community will likely see more uncommon adverse events.

External links
 

Sterilization (medicine)